George Frederick or Georg Friedrich may refer to:

 George A. Frederick (1842–1924), German-American architect
 George Frederick, Margrave of Brandenburg-Ansbach (1539–1603)
 George Frederick II, Margrave of Brandenburg-Ansbach (1678–1703)
 George Frederick (horse) (1871–1896), a British Thoroughbred racehorse and sire
 George III of the United Kingdom (George William Frederick, 1738–1820)
 George IV of the United Kingdom (George Augustus Frederick, 1762–1830)
 George Frederick of Nassau-Siegen (1606–1674)
 George Frederick, Count of Erbach-Breuberg (1636–1653)
 Georg Friedrich, Margrave of Baden-Durlach (1573–1638)
 Georg Friedrich, Prince of Prussia (born 1976)
 Georg Friedrich (actor) (born 1966), Austrian actor

See also
 
 
 
 
 George Fredericks (born 1929), English artist

Frederick, George